The Favaloro University is a private university in the city of Buenos Aires in Argentina. It was founded by surgeon René Favaloro in 1992; it obtained its definitive authorization on October 23, 2003 by decree 963/03 of president Néstor Kirchner. Favaloro did not see his project completely realised, for he committed suicide a few years before completion.

Introduction
The origin of the institution is based in a research center. The university hospital and the University followed a natural development to complement and integrate several areas in the biomedical spectrum. The Research and Development Board (CID) ensures the progress of scientific research and technological development at the Favaloro University, deciding on the principal research orientations and supervising the coherence of scientific policy, particularly regarding the creation of laboratories and research programs. It also establishes the principles and dictates the evaluation mechanisms of research quality and investigator performance.

Research at the Favaloro University is organized in research projects. These projects are under the direction of one or more investigators who are directly responsible for the development of the action plan in the established period. The specific objectives of the relationship between the Research and Development Board and the departmental structure of the Favaloro University are the articulation of the Departments, the Faculty of Medical Sciences, the Faculty of Engineering and Exact and Natural Sciences and the Institute of Cardiology and Cardiovascular Surgery in connection with the research projects. Also, to stimulate teaching activity of the researchers, to promote the research projects coordinated by one or more Departments with the hospital.

Several research activities include surgical experiences with different animals. There are two operating and experimental rooms covering 90m2 equipped with technology for animal instrumentation and experimentation. There is an animal house with a covered area of 432m2 and one computer lab for signal processing and another for hardware development. Other equipments are available including operating tables, anesthesia equipment, monitors, ecography, sonomicrometers, oscilloscopes, defibrillators, PC computers with acquisition systems, respirators, infusion pumps, extracorporeal pump, doppler velocimeter, digital viscometer, oximeters, invasive pressure, diameter and flow velocity transducers. For studies in patients, there is a room for clinical studies in the Hypertension Section of the Favaloro Foundation.

This essential background allows the students to interact directly with the researchers and the medical equipment, not only for research purposes but for clinical training in the operation of new technologies present in the hospital. Finally, the entire faculty is instructed to encourage the future biomedical engineers to interact directly with the hospital environment to ease their future integration in this area.

History
In the beginning, René Favaloro did his medical practice in the Sanatorio Güemes. Later, he realized that an investigation group of his own was necessary. In 1974 he commended Dr. Ricardo Pichel (current Favaloro University rector) for the birth and development of this new area. In 1978, the Newspapers & Magazines Distributors Society (SDDRA) made possible the beginning of investigation and teaching activities. For many years, Favaloro financed investigation costs with his own resources. In 1980 the Teaching and Investigation Department of Favaloro University was founded with Pichel in the lead. Later that year in the Favaloro Foundation, with the collaboration with Willem Kolff in the Artificial Organs Department at the University of Utah, the first artificial heart was implanted in a calf. Between 1980 and 1982 sixteen more hearts were implanted in calves.

At the same time Dr. Peter Willshaw, a Favaloro Foundation investigator, developed (in collaboration with the University of Utah) a measuring device called COMDU (Cardiac Output Monitoring and Diagnostic Unit) which improved artificial heart flux measurement. This device was then used worldwide for investigation and development purposes.

The artificial heart project was then abandoned due to excessive costs. Nevertheless, the acquired equipment made many basic investigation lines in chronically instrumented animals possible, thus an ideal methodology to study the circulatory system. Months later Drs. Alberto Crotoggini, Juan Barra, Pichel and Willshaw made important contributions to the comprehension of heart and circulatory system mechanisms. The agreement signed with California University in 1983 meant a big improvement in ventricular function investigations. That same year Biology Graduates Jorge Negroni and Elena Lascano joined the investigation field and started their work in mathematical models for cardiac function comprehension next to Dr. Edmundo Cabrera Fischer, in charge of arterial function physiology.

Favaloro always supported and collaborated with investigators. He was convinced that without investigation (specifically basic investigation) further development in medicine was impossible: With this idea in mind the Department of Teaching and Investigation and the Division of Basic Investigation turned into the University Institute of Biomedical Sciences and the Institute of Basic Science Investigations, respectively.

Nowadays, the major part of teaching and investigation activities of the Favaloro Foundation is done in the Favaloro University.

Highlights
The major highlights of the university are:
 Permanent interaction between the hospital, the faculties and the research center.
 Continuous formation (graduate, master and doctorate).
 Research, management and development internships.
 A reduced number of students in each course.
 Special attention to basic sciences.
 Most of the professors contribute as researcher or developers in the institution.
 Teaching through technology.

Scientific and technical development
As a complement to the academic structure, Favaloro University has created a specialized group for technical developments called i2b. This group interacts between the basic sciences in the university and the prototype design for future final equipments. Some of their principal projects are detailed below.

Numeric simulation

In this analytic area, the main objectives are to simulate differential equations to find the flow movement in rigid and non-rigid tubes solution. Different advanced techniques, including finite elements algorithms, are being designed to fulfill the computational requirements. CFD (computational fluid dynamics) software is being used to model stent patency after surgical instrumentation in coronary patients.

Digital signal processing

The main objective is to develop equipment involving digital signal processing. Includes signal acquisition, signal conditioning, software development, microcontrollers (PIC, Motorola series) programming, Real time signal processing using digital signal processor (DSP) and Field Programmable Gate Array (FPGA, Altera MAX+PLUS).  Signal communication USB, RS232 and  digital filters implementation

Imaging processing

The main concerns were focused in echographic images. The automatic non-invasive IMT determination and the diameter evolution of superficial arteries, over different maneuvers, were extensively developed. The whole acquisition system was designed and implemented to be echography-model-independent. Moreover, endothelium studies were performed using this approach. The most recent algorithms include the wavelet transform to study atherosclerotic plaque composition.

Cardiovascular modeling

The main interest is to develop new models that describe the cardiovascular system, including arterial mechanics, ventricular coupling, pulmonary/systemic circulation studies, under pathological states as hypertension. To this end, the multidisciplinary team integrates the physiologic concepts with the most advanced mathematical algorithms.

Bioinformatics

The epidemiologic study of great populations deserves a special statistical analysis. The patients’ database and its associated software are designed and customize to study precisely cardiovascular pathologies and diseases in our hospital.  This group concentrates the database design and the networks interconnection between different sections in the university, the hospital and the research center. Different PACS are planned to be designed and installed in the near future to unify the patient clinic history.

Signals, systems and control

Mathematics applied to biomedical engineering. Analysis of blood cells concentrations as long-memory stochastic process, and fractal characteristics. Heart rate variability studies. Wavelet analysis. Automatic detection of epileptic activity in electroencephalograms using wavelets. Analysis of cell migration in the central nervous system. Nonlinear control of HIV in blood

Application of field theory methods to other branches of physics and other sciences

Due to its relation with the most intimate aspects of matter, field theory is the closest branch of theoretical physics to the frontiers of knowledge. Formalisms and other powerful mathematical methods have been developed,  in order to solve its problems. The project consists on the application of such formalisms to other branches of physics and, eventually, to other sciences.

Faculties
 Faculty of Engineering and Exact and Natural Sciences
 Faculty of Medical Sciences
 Faculty of Post-Graduate Studies

Degrees

Faculty of Engineering and Exact and Natural Sciences
 Biology
 Bachelor in Engineering Sciences (BES) is a three-year course devoted to basic sciences, mainly to computing, electronics, mathematics and physics. Students qualify as Bachelors in engineering sciences. This academic level encourages the student to participate as assistant in research and development projects. It is a prerequisite to continuing with anyone of the three branches: Biomedical, Medical Physics and Computer Engineering.

Higher studies cycle
To complete the students development as engineers, three branches are proposed, focusing in the most modern and encouraging domains present in biomedical world. After completing the bachelor's degree, a two-year course is planned to complete the grade degree.

Since hospitals and health care in general are moving into computerization and almost all university doctors — certainly all young doctors — are increasingly computer literate, the opportunities for medical engineers are becoming widespread and significant. Generally, the field has focused on topics, such as image processing, the electronic patient record, equipment development, the semantics of medical terminology, the interpretation of patient data, the security of patient, model creation, simulation and so on.

The aim of the university is to equip students with sufficient knowledge of and insight into the fields of medicine, health care, computing science, physics, electronics and mathematics, divided in three main branches.
 Biomedical Engineering (BME)
 Medical Physics Engineering (MPE)

Faculty of Medical Sciences
 Medicine
 Kinesiology and Physiatry
 Nursery
 Psychology

Faculty of Post-Graduate studies
 Careers and courses
 Distance careers and courses

IEEE Student Branch
Actual configuration

References

External links
 Official site (Spanish)
 Favaloro Foundation (English) 
 Fundación Favaloro (Epañol) 

 Medical schools in Argentina
Private universities in Argentina
Universities in Buenos Aires Province